James Jack (ジェームズ ジャック, born 1979) is a contemporary artist based in Singapore.

Early life and education 
Jack was raised on the East side of Manhattan, lived in Kyoto during the late 1990s and has lived in Asia Pacific for the past two decades. Jack received a Bachelor of Arts degree from Sarah Lawrence College studying with Gary Burnley, Sandy Skoglund, and Joel Sternfeld and completed advanced studies in Japanese at the Stanford Inter-University Center for Japanese Studies. He completed a Master of Arts degree in Japanese Art History at the University of Hawai‘i at Mānoa and a Ph.D. in the Painting Department with Yoshitaka Mōri, Tsuyoshi Ozawa, Ritsuko Taho and Toyomi Hoshina at Tokyo University of the Arts.

Career 
Jack was a Crown Prince Akihito Scholar pursuing artistic research in Tokyo from 2008 to 2010. He was a Japan Society for the Promotion of Science Postdoctoral Artist Fellow at Social Art Lab at Kyushu University from 2016 to 2017 and taught Art Practice at Yale-NUS College in Singapore from 2018-2022 while directing the Artist-in-Residence program and is currently Associate Professor of Intermedia Art at Waseda University.

Selected artwork

Sunset House, 2010-2020 
Jack created a community artwork titled Sunset House: The House as Language of Being for the Setouchi Triennale (2013/2016) in the former site of a clubhouse for stone quarry workers on the island of Shodo.

Molokai Window, 2018 
Jack worked with residents on the island of Molokai to respectfully open a window with local pigments and stories that recenter islands in the Pacific according to local protocols for community collaboration in the solo exhibition Molokai Window held at Honolulu Museum of Art in 2018 curated by Healoha Johnston supported by the inaugural artist-in-residence program at Molokai Arts Center.

Sea Birth trilogy, 2017-2020 
Sea Birth trilogy is composed of sea spirits, love amidst violence and rebirth. Sea Birth one was exhibited at Museum of the Sky in 2016, Sea Birth two was exhibited at Ichihanari Art Festival in Okinawa during 2018 and Sea Birth three at the University of Hawai‘i at Mānoa Art Gallery and Donkey Mill Art Center in 2020. Selections from the work have also been screened at Centre for Contemporary Art Singapore, BARRAK alternative art space Okinawa and Asia Research Institute at National University of Singapore.

Exhibitions 
Jack's artworks engaging with social and ecological environments have been included in numerous exhibitions including: Honolulu Museum of Art (2018); Centre for Contemporary Art Singapore (2017); Fukuoka Prefectural Museum of Art (2016); Setouchi International Art Festival (2013 and 2016); Tokyo Metropolitan Museum of Art (2015); Institute of Contemporary Art Singapore (2014); Busan Biennale Sea Art Festival (2013); and the Echigo-Tsumari Triennial (2009).

Writings 
His writings have been published in Shima, Art Asia Pacific, The Japan Times, Modern Art Asia, LASALLE College of the Arts Singapore, Satoshi Koyama Gallery and The Contemporary Museum of Hawai‘i.

Artist Collective 
Jack is one of the founding members of the artist collective World Dirt Association that began in 2014 with Yoshitaka Nanjo and Shotaro Yoshino based on their love of earth. WDA exhibitions and projects include the “Land and Water Festival” Niigata 2015, SYP Projects 2015, Ichihara Art x Mix 2017 and Social Art Lab Yame Remix. Upcoming projects include a performative work based on local residents’ stories of dirt “Soilstory” to be presented at Suzu 2020 Okunoto Triennale that is currently postponed to 2021.

Residencies 
Jack has been artist in residence at the Centre for Contemporary Art Singapore, Vermont Studio Center, Ku Art Center, Sitka Center for Art & Ecology, and the Orford Center.

Media

Inundation: Art and Climate Change in the Pacific 
Jaimey Hamilton Faris and Azusa Takahashi

2020

In Praise of Shadows 
Michelle Ho

2017

One-hundred Stories Told by Art 
Masahiro Ushiroshōji

2016

Literature 

 Wee, Darryl Jingwen, “James Jack’s Sunset House on Shodoshima”, BLOUIN ARTINFO, 5 November 2013
 Kitagawa, Fram, “Yūyake hausu: Gengo ga yadoru ie” (“Sunset House: Language as the house of Being”), Shikoku shinbun, 6 July 2013
 “Play with Nature, Played by Nature”, Exhibition catalog author, Tokyo: Satoshi Koyama Gallery, June 2013
 “Philosophies of Dirt: James Jack”, Introduction by poet Brandon Shimoda, Solo exhibition catalog, Tokyo: Satoshi Koyama Gallery, October 2012

References 

American expatriates in Singapore
American artists
Academic staff of the National University of Singapore
1979 births
Living people